Lauri de Frece (3 March 1880 – 25 August 1921) was an English actor and singer who appeared in musical theatre and in films of the silent era. His original name was Maurice de Frece. He was the younger brother of Walter de Frece and the husband of Fay Compton.

He was sometimes been confused with a cousin called Lawrence Abraham de Frece, who was born in 1881 and died later the same year.

Life

Born in Liverpool, Lauri de Frece was one of four sons of Harry de Frece, of the Gaiety Music Hall, Liverpool, a prosperous theatrical manager and agent from a Jewish theatrical family. The four sons were well educated at the Liverpool Institute High School for Boys, in the hope of keeping them out of the theatre. However, Frece's brother Jack became the manager of the Alhambra Wooden Theatre, Liverpool, his brother Isaac managed the Theatre Royal, Liverpool, and in 1890 his brother Walter gave up an apprenticeship with a Merseyside architect to marry Vesta Tilley, taking a job in the office of Warner's Theatrical Agency, and going on to become a leading theatrical impresario. 

At the Liverpool Institute, de Frece was a contemporary of Albert Coates.
In 1910, de Frece appeared as Blatz in the musical The Balkan Princess. In 1912, he sang the part of Brissard in an Edinburgh production of Franz Lehár's operetta The Count of Luxembourg, when he was one of the five principals, together with Daisy Burrell, Phyllis le Grand, Eric Thorne, and Robert Michaelis, collectively described by the Musical News as "all consummate artists in their own style".

In 1914, after the death of the producer H. G. Pelissier, de Frece married his young widow, Fay Compton,	with whom he later starred in The Labour Leader (1917).

Death
He died in August 1921, aged 41, from undisclosed causes, in Trouville-sur-Mer, Normandy. In February 1922 his widow remarried, to Leon Quartermaine.

In his Idols of the "Halls", Henry Chance Newton (1854–1931) recalled that "I knew many de Freces, both of the Liverpudlian, and of the London brand; for example, that wonderful old couple, Isaac and Maurice de Frece, Walter's brother Jack, a big variety agent, also that late fine comedian, poor Lauri de Frece, who was the second husband of that brilliant young actress, Fay Compton."

Musical theatre
The Balkan Princess (1910) as Blatz
The Count of Luxembourg (1912) as Brissard
To-Night's the Night (1914) as Henry
The Happy Day (1916) as Walter
The Maid of the Mountains as Tonio

Films
Incomplete list
The Labour Leader (1917)
Once Upon a Time (1918)
All the Sad World Needs (1918)

Notes

External links

Lauri de Frece at National Portrait Gallery, London
Lauri de Frece at discogs.com

1880 births
1921 deaths
English male film actors
English male stage actors
English male silent film actors
English male musical theatre actors
People educated at Liverpool Institute High School for Boys
Male actors from Liverpool
20th-century English male actors
20th-century English singers
20th-century British male singers